Flour Mills of Nigeria (FMN) is a Nigerian diversified agribusiness company, it was founded in 1960 by George S. Coumantaros. FMN employs over 12,000 people.

FMN was founded by George S. Coumantaros in 1960 as a private limited company and in 1978 became a public company, with its shares listed on the Nigerian Stock Exchange.

The chairman of FMN since 2014, and its former CEO is the founder's son, John Coumantaros. The CEO is Omoboye Olusanya.

Flour Mills today, is a holding company with a vertically integrated business model.

The flagship brand of the company is Golden Penny Flour.

History
Flour Mills started operations in 1962, the first wheat mill plant in Nigeria, it was built at a cost of £2.5m financed by Greek and American capital through Southern Star Shipping company. Initial annual production was 120,000 tonnes. The company's Apapa complex has bulk unloading and storage capabilities with a mill to process North American wheat blends. In 1964, the company expanded its offering with the establishment of a polypropylene manufacturing plant that traded under the business name Nigerian Bag Manufacturing Company Limited. The initial facility also processed wheat offals to be exported.

By 1971, the annual capacity of its wheat mill was 300,000 tonnes. In 1975, the company bought minority equity interest in Northern Nigeria Flours Mills, Kano and later acquired interest in Niger Mills of Calabar. In the late 1970s, the company was listed on the Nigerian Stock exchange.

The FMN brand sprouted from a single commodity company, to a conglomerate operating in key sectors of the Nigerian economy. They operate in  four major sectors of Food, Su, Agro-allied, Port Operations and Logistics, Packaging and Real Estate. They operate a vertically integrated supply food chain amongst their other businesses.

In 1990, another polypropylene manufacturing business was established in 1997 in Northern Nigeria trading under the business name Northern Bag Manufacturing Company, two years later Golden Shipping Company was established. In 1997, an extension of business offerings led to the founding of a fertilizer marketing business, expansion continued with the introduction of a cement partnership UNICEM in 2002, port management trading under the name Apapa Bulk Terminal in 2004, Golden Transport in 2008 and Premier Feeds in 2010. In August 2015, a holding company, Excelsior Shipping was established to manage the affairs of some of its subsidiaries. Apapa Bulk Terminal operates Terminal A and B at Apapa Port.

The company operated a bulk cement bagging operation at Apapa trading Burham Cement, following compliance with government regulations to promote local cement manufacturing that operation was discontinued at the firm went into a partnership with Orascom to establish a cement facility at Mfanmosing, Cross River State.

In 2021, FMN acquired 71.6% of Honeywell Group's Honeywell Flour Mills Plc.

Subsidiaries

References

External links

Companies based in Lagos
Food and drink companies of Nigeria
Food and drink companies established in 1960
Nigerian companies established in 1960
Holding companies of Nigeria